The 1927 Michigan State Spartans football team represented Michigan State College as an independent during the 1927 college football season. In their fifth year under head coach Ralph H. Young, the Spartans compiled a 4–5 record and were outscored by their opponents 128 to 111.

Schedule

Game summaries

Michigan

On October 8, 1927, Michigan State lost to Michigan by a 21-0 score. Michigan's first two touchdowns came on running plays by halfback Louis Gilbert and fullback George Rich, and the third came on a pass from quarterback Leo Hoffman to left end Bennie Oosterbaan.

NC State

Sources:

In the season's final game, Michigan State traveled south to Raleigh to play NC State. On a muddy, waterlogged field, NC State won 19 to 0. The NC State team claims a Southern Conference title this year, with this contest arguably its biggest win. Their captain and hall of famer Jack McDowall was cited as the best player in this his final game, despite his only scoring play being a pass for an extra point.

References

Michigan State
Michigan State Spartans football seasons
Michigan State Spartans football